In jazz music, the Montgomery-Ward bridge (also Rielpel's Monte) is a standard chord progression often used as the bridge, or 'B section', of a jazz standard. The progression consists, in its most basic form, of the chords I7–IV7–ii7–V7. Often, some or all of the dominants are substituted with ii–V progressions or otherwise altered. This is used in such standards as "The Sunny Side of the Street", "When You're Smiling", "Satin Doll", and particularly "Honeysuckle Rose".

Eight bars:
{| class="wikitable"
|width="30px"| v7 ||width="30px"| I7 ||width="30px"| IV ||width="30px"| IV ||width="30px"| vi m7 ||width="30px"| II7 ||width="30px"| ii m7 ||width="30px"| V7 || 
|}

See also
 Turnaround (music)

References

Jazz techniques
Chord progressions